Abzakovo is the name of several rural localities in the Republic of Bashkortostan, Russia:
Abzakovo, Baymaksky District, Republic of Bashkortostan, a village in Baymaksky District
Abzakovo, Beloretsky District, Republic of Bashkortostan, a selo in Beloretsky District, and the ski resort of the same name located there
Abzakovo, Uchalinsky District, Republic of Bashkortostan, a village in Uchalinsky District